Greenwood is a village in McHenry County, Illinois,  United States. It is a commuter village, part of the Chicago metropolitan area It was incorporated as a village on 4 April 1995. The population was 324 at the 2020 census.

Geography
Greenwood is located at  (42.391353, -88.386788).

Major streets
 Greenwood Road
 Howe Road
 West Wonder Lake Road
 Thompson Road
 Wondermere Road
 Allendale Road
 Miller Road

Demographics

As of the census of 2000, there were 244 people, 84 households, and 66 families residing in the village. The racial makeup of the village was 93.03% White, 2.46% Asian, 0.82% from other races, and 3.69% from two or more races. Hispanic or Latino of any race were 6.56% of the population.

There were 84 households, out of which 34.5% had children under the age of 18 living with them, 64.3% were married couples living together, 6.0% had a female householder with no husband present, and 21.4% were non-families. 16.7% of all households were made up of individuals, and 4.8% had someone living alone who was 65 years of age or older. The average household size was 2.90 and the average family size was 3.27.

In the village, the population was spread out, with 29.1% under the age of 18, 6.6% from 18 to 24, 28.3% from 25 to 44, 25.0% from 45 to 64, and 11.1% who were 65 years of age or older. The median age was 38 years. For every 100 females, there were 101.7 males. For every 100 females age 18 and over, there were 101.2 males.

The median income for a household in the village was $56,250, and the median income for a family was $65,179. Males had a median income of $40,000 versus $32,708 for females. The per capita income for the village was $19,216. About 3.2% of families and 7.2% of the population were below the poverty line, including 11.8% of those under the age of eighteen and none of those 65 or over.

References

External links
History of Greenwood, IL.

Villages in McHenry County, Illinois
Villages in Illinois
Chicago metropolitan area
Populated places established in 1995